Christie Front Drive was an emo band from Denver, Colorado active between 1993 and 1997. The lineup consisted of Eric Richter (vocals and guitar), Jason Begin (guitar), Kerry McDonald (bass) and Ron Marschall (drums). Bands such as Superchunk, Jawbreaker, Jawbox, Buffalo Tom, and Drive Like Jehu were cited as influences.

History
The band released a self-titled EP and a 7-inch on Freewill Records in 1994. The two Freewill Records albums and several 7-inch were later combined and released as a self-titled full-length album (commonly referred to as Anthology). In 1995, Christie Front Drive released split records with Jimmy Eat World, Sineater, and Boys Life. They also contributed to several compilation albums including (Don't Forget To) Breathe from Crank! Records. The band broke up in 1997 and their only official full length, a self-titled album (commonly referred to as Stereo) was released posthumously by Caulfield Records.

Despite their short tenure, Christie Front Drive became a major influence on emo music in the 1990s. Eric Richter resurfaced in the bands Antarctica, The 101, and Golden City, and both Marschall and Begin went on to form The Blue Ontario. Marschall was also credited as an engineer on The Apples in Stereo's album, The Discovery of a World Inside the Moone and plays in Phoenix-based Tierra del Fuego. Jason Begin is currently performing under the name This Body as well as the Portland-based band Pireate Radio Deluxe and the random appearance with Modernstate. Bassist Kerry McDonald would go on to form The Mighty Rime, who released a self-titled record on Caulfield Records in 2002.

Christie Front Drive reunited on September 1, 2007, at the Marquis Theater in Denver as part of DenverFest III. All four original members participated. Magic Bullet Records home of Eric Richter's current band Golden City, announced plans to re-release the entire Christie Front Drive discography. The label began with releasing a remastered version of their final self-titled album (also known as Stereo) on June 15, 2010, along with a DVD of the band's final show in 1996. In April 2019, Dark Operative records, formerly Magic Bullet Records, re-released the band's self-titled 7-inch and self-titled 12-inch on vinyl.

In March 2014, it was announced that Christie Front Drive would reunite for a show on May 17, 2014, as part of Pouzza Fest.

Discography

Studio albums

EPs

Singles

Compilation albums

Non-album tracks

External links
 Official Website
  Myspace
 Magic Bullet Records
Dark Operative

References 

American emo musical groups
Indie rock musical groups from Colorado
Musical groups from Denver
Musical groups established in 1993
Musical groups disestablished in 1997
Caulfield Records artists
1993 establishments in Colorado